Dear Ladies is a British comedy television series which aired on the BBC in 21 episodes between 1983 and 1984. It featured the comic characters Hinge and Bracket, played by George Logan and Patrick Fyffe.

The comedy is set in and around the house the ladies shared in the fictional village of Stackton Tressel in Suffolk and gives viewers "A glimpse behind the scenes of village life in Stackton Tressel."

Production
The scripts were written by George Logan and Patrick Fyffe, who played the starring roles, in collaboration with the writer and broadcaster Gyles Brandreth. Brandreth described Hinge and Bracket as "a drag act with a difference. They offered character and comedy instead of glamour and sex appeal."

Exterior scenes in Stackton Tressel village were filmed on location in the Cheshire towns of Knutsford, Great Budworth and Nantwich.

A special episode was broadcast after the 1984 series, the "Dear Ladies Masterclass", in which Hinge and Bracket are invited to deliver a music masterclass at the Royal Northern College of Music in Manchester. The episode features students of the college, who perform under the tutelage of the two Ladies.

Cast
Dear Ladies cast members included:

George Logan — Dr Evadne Hinge
Patrick Fyffe — Dame Hilda Bracket
Geoffrey Banks — Rev. Donald Smollit
Frances Cox — Miss Grace Pullet (Librarian)
Terry Gilligan  — various roles
Madeleine Newbury — Joan Shanks
Paula Tilbrook — Party Organiser
Hope Johnstone — Party Organiser
Richard Aylen — Courtney Pines
Rosalie Williams — Dodie Bantock

Episode list

References

Bibliography
 David Pringle. Imaginary People: A Who's who of Fictional Characters from the Eighteenth Century to the Present Day. Scolar Press, 1996.

External links
 
 

BBC television comedy
1983 British television series debuts
1984 British television series endings
1980s British comedy television series
English-language television shows
Hinge and Bracket
Television shows set in Suffolk
Television shows filmed in England
Drag (clothing) television shows
BBC television sitcoms